Robert Allen (born June 7, 1969) is an American former professional boxer from Atlanta, Georgia.  He was born in New Orleans, Louisiana and fought as a middleweight.

Amateur career 
Allen was a standout as an amateur, becoming the 1992 United States Amateur Light middleweight champion.

Professional career 
Nicknamed Armed & Dangerous he has held several minor titles and fought for the world middleweight title three times against all time great middleweight champion Bernard Hopkins.  The first fight ended in a no contest when Hopkins was pushed out of the ring by referee Mills Lane when he was breaking a clinch.  In the second fight Hopkins knocked Allen out in the 7th round.  In their third fight Hopkins won an easy 12 round decision.  As of November 14, 2008 his record stands at 39(27)-5(4).

References 
 

|-

1969 births
Living people
Boxers from Georgia (U.S. state)
Middleweight boxers
Sportspeople from New Orleans
Winners of the United States Championship for amateur boxers
American male boxers